Italian Hebrew or Italki Hebrew refers to the pronunciation system for liturgical Hebrew traditionally used by Italian Jews.

Features
The Italian pronunciation of Hebrew is similar to that of conservative Spanish and Portuguese Jews.  Distinguishing features are:
 beth rafe is pronounced ;
 he is often silent, as in the family name "Coen";
 vav is normally  as in most Hebrew dialects, but can become  in diphthongs (as in the family name "Anau").  Thus, in construct masculine plurals with male singular possessive suffix יו-, the pronunciation is not [- but [-;
 zayin is often pronounced  like Italian voiced "z";
 ayin is pronounced  (like English "ng" in "sing").  In some dialects, like the Roman, this sometimes becomes , like the Italian combination "gn";
 final tav is pronounced ;
 speakers in communities south of the La Spezia isogloss, and Jewish communities transplanted north of this, pronounce dagesh forte as a true geminate sound, in keeping with the pronunciation of double letters in Italian.

This pronunciation has in many cases been adopted by the Sephardi, Ashkenazi and Appam communities of Italy as well as by the Italian rite communities.

References

Hebrew
Italki Jews topics
Languages of Italy